Tom's Little Star is a 1919 short film and a part of the Stage Women's War Relief films.

It is unknown if a copy of this film survives, but more of a chance it might be lost. The film, directed by George Terwilliger,  is known for being the oldest film appearance of Broadway producer Florenz Ziegfeld Jr.

References

External links

1919 films
1919 short films
American silent short films
American black-and-white films
Films directed by George Terwilliger
1910s American films